Mahmoud al-Aloul (b. 1950) was the governor of the Palestinian Authority's Nablus governorate in the Central Highlands of the West Bank. al-Aloul was elected to the Central Committee of Fatah in August 2009, and Vice Chairman in 2016. In early 2018, he was widely discussed as the likely successor to Mahmoud Abbas as President of the Palestinian Authority.

After the Six-Day War, al-Aloul was arrested by Israel and sent to live in Jordan, where he joined Fatah.  He rose within Fatah, and, in the 1970s, moved to Lebanon. There he served under Khalil al-Wazir, as commander of a Fatah brigade that captured eight Israeli soldiers in 1983. The Israeli prisoners were exchanged for Palestinian prisoners in Israeli hands.

According to Aloul, the Palestinians still maintain their belief in armed struggle against the State of Israel.

References

1950 births
Living people
People from Nablus
Fatah members
Government ministers of the Palestinian National Authority
Members of the 2006 Palestinian Legislative Council
Governors of Nablus Governorate
Central Committee of Fatah members